Andropogon (common names: beard grass, bluestem grass, broomsedge) is a widespread genus of plants in the grass family, native to much of Asia, Africa, and the Americas, as well as Southern Europe and various oceanic islands.

Over 100 species have been described.

Species

  

Many species once included in Andropogon are now regarded as better suited to other genera, including Agenium,  Anadelphia,  Apluda,  Arthraxon,  Bothriochloa,  Capeochloa,  Capillipedium,  Chrysopogon,  Cymbopogon,  Dichanthium,  Diheteropogon,  Elionurus,  Elymandra,  Eragrostis,  Eulalia,  Garnotia,  Gymnopogon,  Hemarthria,  Heteropogon,  Hyparrhenia,  Hyperthelia,  Ischaemum,  Parahyparrhenia,  Pentameris,  Polytrias,  Pseudopogonatherum,  Pseudosorghum,  Saccharum,  Schizachyrium,  Sorghastrum,  Sorghum,  Spodiopogon,  Themeda,  and Trachypogon.

See also
 List of Poaceae genera

References

External links

 

 
Poaceae genera
Grasses of Africa
Grasses of Asia
Grasses of Europe
Grasses of North America
Grasses of Oceania
Grasses of South America
Andropogoneae